The Dressing Point massacre refers to the murder in 1826 of 40-50 Karankawa people in Mexican Texas near present-day Matagorda at the mouth of the Colorado River by Texian Militia. It was part of a pattern of colonist attacks against Native Americans in the area after the former began to encroach on native lands, and conflicts arose over use of the territory. Ultimately the Karankawa ceded their territory to the European Americans, and were dispersed to other areas, became day laborers, were forced into slavery, or killed. By 1860, no free Karankawa remained here.

History

Background
Due to the formation of the First Mexican Republic in 1823 and the opening of Mexican Texas to colonists from the United States, the European-American population of Texas increased rapidly.  They pushed Native Americans off their land. Struggling to survive, the native people raided the new settlers' cattle, and deep hostility and conflict arose between the two groups.

In the Galveston Bay region populated chiefly by the Karankawa Indians, Native Americans in the 1820s still outnumbered White colonists. The most recent European-American settlers came from well-settled regions of the Southern United States and were not accustomed to living among large Indian populations in a non-dominant relationship.  The Americanos took new settlements without offering gifts, sharing the land, or allowing raids on their livestock in the manner of the longer-settled Tejano. In 1823 Stephen F. Austin began to claim rich tracts of land near bays and river , which were occupied by the Coco and the Carancaguas, subgroups of the Karankawa. The Karankawa relied on these bays for the fish and shellfish that provided their winter protein sources, and they were fiercely protective of that territory.

After scouting the land, Austin wrote that extermination of the Karankawa would be necessary, although his first encounter with the tribe was friendly.  He spread rumors among the settlers, attributing cannibalism and extreme violence to the Karankawa, and sometimes more specifically to the Carancaguas.  Research has suggested that these accusations of cannibalism were false, possibly caused by his confusion of the Karankawa with another tribe. The Karankawa had been horrified by cannibalism which they saw practiced by shipwrecked Spaniards.  

Austin's stories primed the colonists to believe that it would be impossible for them to live among the Karankawa.  When the Karankawa began to poach the livestock being ranched on the land that had been taken from their territory, conflict erupted between the groups. Several massacres were committed by settlers against the natives, including the Skull Creek Massacre. The Whites encouraged neighboring Indian tribes to kill the Karankawa, and Austin rewarded them with bounties of lead and gunpowder if they did so. By 1824 the Karankawa were under enough stress that a local Carancaguase chief, Antonio, signed a treaty abandoning their homelands east of the Guadalupe River.

The displaced Karankawa ran into difficulties west of the Guadalupe, as the Comanche, Lipan, and fellow groups of Karankawa were already using available land.  Chief Antonio’s treaty was violated by Karankawa tribesmen who continued to go to the bay for fishing as well as poach cattle from the settlers east of the Guadalupe.  At this point Austin ordered his men to "Pursue and kill all those Indians wherever they are found."

Incident
After an Indian attack against the Cavanaugh and Flowers families, Aylett C. Buckner led a Texian Militia company against the Karankawa. Finding a band of Coco Indians trapped near the Colorado River about three miles north of the present-day town of Matagorda, the militia began to shoot the Coco men, women, and children by rifles as they swam through the water and climbed the opposite bank in a desperate attempt to flee.

Consequences
The colonists called this massacre site "Dressing Point" because there the Indians had received the "dressing they deserved".  After the massacre, the Coco Indians abandoned the region and settled west of the Guadalupe with the other tribes.  Other smaller groups remained, but were continually harassed by the settlers, who took on "Indian hunting" as a sport. They also regularly raped Indian women.  

On May 13, 1827, Chief Antonio signed a second peace treaty, permanently ceding the land to the colonists.  That year Austin founded the town of Matagorda, three miles from Dressing Point, in order to "protect" settlers from the Indians.  Having difficulty in finding uninhabited regions that would sustain life, the remaining bands of Karankawa dispersed: some became day laborers in towns and on plantations, others were taken as slaves by Austin's settlers, or were killed in later conflicts. By 1860, the free Karankawa had been eliminated in this area.

See also

 Texian Militia
 List of conflicts involving the Texas Military

Karankawa people
Stephen F. Austin
List of Indian massacres
Terrorism in the United States

Notes

References

1827 in Texas
1827 in the United States
Massacres in 1826
Native American history of Texas
Massacres of Native Americans
History of Texas
Karankawa people
Military history of Texas
History of racism in Texas
Conflicts in 1826
1826 murders in the United States
1826 in Texas
1826 in the United States